The Red Line is one of the two lines on the Dubai Metro network in Dubai, United Arab Emirates. The Red Line runs from Rashidiya in the east to Jebel Ali in the west and travels parallel to Sheikh Zayed Road for most of its length. 

There are two transfer stations with the Green Line at Union and BurJuman stations. Additionally, Jabal Ali is an interchange between the main Red Line and a branch to UAE Exchange. The Red Line has its main depot at Rashidiya and an auxiliary depot at UAE Exchange.

Additionally, DMCC and Sobha Realty have connections to the Dubai Tram at Jumeirah Lake Towers and Dubai Marina respectively.

History
The first section was inaugurated on 9 September 2009 with ten stations opened. Construction was declared complete on 28 April 2010 with an additional 16 stations opened during 2010.

In 2010, the Red Line carried a total of 38.888 million passengers with a daily average of about 149,000 people, according to the RTA Statistics Office. In 2013, the Red Line handled a total of over 88 million passengers and the daily average was about 243,000 people.

Three additional stations were added between 2011-2013 making a total of 29 stations spanning . The line was the world's longest single metro line to use driverless trains, as recognized by Guinness World Records in 2011.

Route 2020
As part of the Expo 2020 development in Dubai, an extension of the Red Line named "Route 2020" announced in December 2015 and originally due to be completed mid-2019. The extension project creates a branch of the line from Jabal Ali and the Nakheel Harbour & Tower to the Expo 2020 site, near Al Maktoum International Airport. 

Construction of the Route 2020 metro line was started in 2016 by the ExpoLink Consortium, comprising Alstom, Acciona, and Gülermak. The line was formally inaugurated by Sheikh Mohammed Bin Rashid Al Maktoum, Dubai's Ruler and UAE Prime Minister, on 8 July 2020.

The extension was partially opened on 1 January 2021, between Jabal Ali and Al Furjan and fully opened on 1 June 2021.

As a result of increasing popularity of the metro, the new stations feature platforms wider than those found in existing stations, to cope with greater ridership.

The track layout east of Jabal Ali station was modified to create a new branch and one additional platform to serve the new route. The extension was partially opened on 1 January 2021, with trains running a shuttle service between Jabal Ali and Al Furjan. The route is expected to have 275,000 users each day by 2030. Upon the full opening of the new stations at Expo 2020 and Dubai Investments Parks on 1 June 2021, the Route 2020 stations became part of the main Red Line route, with the Red Line stations between Jabal Ali and UAE Exchange became served by a separate service on a branch. 

Of the seven stations, five are elevated and two are underground. Eventually it is planned to extend the line beyond Expo 2020 to Al Maktoum International Airport, south of the Expo site.

The travel time between Rashidiya metro station at the northern terminus of the Red Line and the Expo 2020 station is reported to be 1 hour 14 minutes with a service frequency of 2 minutes and 38 seconds during peak times (24 trains per hour in each direction), and a capacity of 16,000 passengers per hour in each direction.

Route
As of 2021, the Red Line had 31 stations on the main line, and an additional 4 stations on the branch.

170 feeder buses are provided by the RTA for commuters to commute to stations on the line are also in operation, as of 15 October 2010.

Services
The average time between stations on the Red Line is 60–90 seconds. The RTA operates 27 trains in the morning peak hours and 29 trains in the evening peak hours with the interval between train services ranging from 6 to 8 minutes in the morning peak period, and from 5 to 6 minutes in the evening peak period.

Station naming
The Dubai Roads and Transport Authority (RTA) has benefited significantly from businesses along the routes of the Red and Green lines sponsoring nearby stations. The naming initiative has so far generated over Dh2 billion in revenue for the RTA. On average, each station has brought in Dh90-100 million.

On 13 May 2010, it was announced that Al Quoz station, which opened on 15 May, would be named Noor Islamic Bank. This announcement that Noor Islamic Bank won the right to name Al Quoz Station for a period of ten years was made in the presence of the bank's representatives at the RTA headquarters in Dubai. Moreover, several other stations on the Red Line have been named after local and international corporate giants, including, Emirates Airlines, GGICO, Abu Dhabi Commercial Bank (Al Karama), First Abu Dhabi Bank, Sharaf DG, Nakheel, DAMAC Properties (Dubai Marina), Danube (Jebel Ali Industrial) and Mashreq.

On 4 August 2021, the Red Line metro stations of Al Rashidiya (R11) and Al Jafiliya (R21), were renamed as 'Centrepoint' (from Rashidiya) and 'Max Fashion' (from Jafiliya).

In the future, after the six-month run of Expo 2020, the Expo 2020 station (76) will be renamed as Expo City Dubai after the planned development for the Expo 2020 site.

On 11 January 2023, it was announced that “Al Safa Station” was renamed as Onpassive station

References

External links

 Dubai Metro 2015: Red Line Jebel Ali (UAE Exchange) – Rashidiya HD on YouTube
 Dubai Metro Red Line 2019 UAE Exchange To Rashidiya on YouTube
 Dubai Metro 2015: Red Line Jebel Ali (UAE Exchange) – Rashidiya HD on YouTube

2009 establishments in the United Arab Emirates
Dubai Metro Red Line
Dubai Metro
Roads and Transport Authority (Dubai)